This is a complete list of the presidents of the Royal College of Surgeons of Edinburgh. The Trade Guild of Edinburgh Barbers and Surgeons was incorporated by the granting of a 'Seal of Cause' in 1505 to become 'The Incorporation of Surgeons and Barbers of Edinburgh'. The incorporation was granted a royal charter by King George III in 1778, giving it the title of "The Royal College of Surgeons of the City of Edinburgh". Prior to 1778, the president was referred to as the deacon.

The president is normally elected in November and now serves for three years. The current president is Professor Michael Griffin .

List of presidents

16th century
Deacons
1535–36 Lancellot Barbour
1536–37 Anthony Brussat	
1537–38 No record
1539–40 George Leithe	
1540–42 No record
1543–55 William Quhite	
1555–57 Alexander Bruce	
1557–58 Nowie Brussat	
1558–59 Alexander Bruce	
1559–60 Patrick Lindesay	
1560–62 Robert Hendersoun	
1562–65 James Lindesay	
1565–66 John Chalmer	
1566–67 Nowie Brussat	
1567–68 Alexander Bruce	
1568–69 Nowie Brussat	
1569–70 Alexander Bruce	
1570 Alexander Bruce	
1571–72 No record
1572–73 Robert Hendersoun	
1573–74 Nowie Brussat	
1574–78 Gilbert Primrose	
1578–80 Robert Hendersoun	
1580–83 Gilbert Primrose	
1583–84 Robert Hendersoun	
1584–86 Henrie Blyth	
1586–87 James Craig	
1587–88 James Henrysoun	
1588–89 James Lindsay	
1589–91 James Henrysoun	
1591–92 James Craig	
1592–94 Hendrie Lumisden	
1594–95 James Rig	
1595–96 John Naysmyth	
1596–98 Hendrie Lumisden	
1598–1600 Andro Scott

17th century
1600–01 James Henrysoun
1601–00 Henrie Aikman	
1602–03 Gilbert Primrose	
1603–05 James Skaithmure	
1605–06 Hendrie Lumisden/James Kinloch	
1606–08 Andro Scott	
1608–10 James Kinloch	
1610–12 Henrie Aikman	
1612–14 David Pringle	
1614–16 James Henrysoun	
1616–18 Andro Scott	
1618–19 James Henrysoun	
1619–20 James Kinloch	
1620–21 James Brown/Andro Scott	
1621–20 Andro Scott
1622–24 David Pringle	
1624–26 Henry Aikman	
1626–27 John Pringill	
1627–29 Andro Scott	
1629–31 Laurence Cockburne	
1631–32 John Ker
1632–33 John Spang
1633–35 James Rig
1635–37 John Pringill
1637–39 David Douglas
1639–40 John Pringle
1640–41 David Douglas
1641–42 James Rig
1642–44 John Scott
1644–46 Alexander Pennycuik
1646–48 David Douglas
1648–51 James Borthwick
1651–52 David Kennedy
1652–55 William Burnet
1655–57 Thomas Kincaid
1657–59 James Cleilland
1659–61 James Borthwick
1661–63 William Burnet
1663–65 Walter Trumble
1665–67 Arthur Temple
1667–69 Thomas Carter
1669–71 Arthur Temple
1671–73 Samwell Cheislie
1673–75 John Jossie
1675–77 William Borthwick
1677–79 George Stirling
1679–81 James Nisbet
1681–83 William Borthwick
1683–84 David Turnbull
1684–85 David Pringle
1685–87 Thomas Edgar
1687–89 John Baillie
1689–91 George Stirling
1691–92 John Raynolds
1692–93 James Crawford
1693–95 Gideon Eliot
1695–97 Alexander Monteith
1697–99 Thomas Dunlop acts in place of Gideon Eliot who refuses to accept office
1699    Gideon Eliot
1699–1700 Alexander Monteith

18th century
1701–02 Alexander Monteith acts in place of Robert Clerk who refuses to accept office
1702–04 James Hamilton
1704–06 Henry Hamilton
1706–08 John Mirrie
1708–10 Alexander Nesbet
1710–12 Henry Hamilton
1712–13 John Monro
1714–16 John Lauder
1716–18 John McGill
1718–20 John Lauder
1720–22 Robert Hope
1722–24 John Knox
1724–25 John Kirkwood
1725–26 John Kennedy
1726–28 John Kirkwood
1728–30 John Kennedy
1730–32 John Lauder
1732–34 John McGill
1734–36 John Kennedy
1736–37 John Lauder
1737–39 William Mitchel
1739–40 George Cunninghame
1740–42 Alexander Nesbet
1742–44 George Langlands
1744–46 George Lauder
1746–48 George Cunninghame
1748–50 Adam Drummond
1750–52 George Cunningham
1752–54 James Russell
1754–56 Robert Walker
1756–58 Thomas Young
1758–60 William Chalmer
1760–62 John Balfour
1762–64 Alexander Wood
1764–66 James Rae
1766–68 James Brodie
1768–70 Robert Smith
1770–72 David Wardrobe
1772–74 William Inglis
1774–76 Andrew Wood
1776–78 Alexander Hamilton

Presidents 
1778–80 James Gibson
1780–82 William Chalmer
1782–84 William Inglis
1784–86 Thomas Hay
1786–88 Forrest Dewar
1788–90 Andrew Wardrop
1790–92 William Inglis
1792–94 Thomas Wood
1794–96 Thomas Hay
1796–98 James Russell
1798–1800 Andrew Wood

19th century
1800–02 James Law
1802–04 John Bennet
1804–06 John Rae
1806–08 William Farquharson
1808–10 Andrew Inglis
1810–12 Alexander Gillespie
1812–14 James Law
1814–16 Sir William Newbigging
1816–18 James Bryce
1818–20 Alexander Gillespie
1820–22 John Henry Wishart
1822–24 William Wood
1824–26 David Hay
1826–28 David Maclagan
1828–30 William Wood, second term
1830–32 John Gairdner
1832–34 John Campbell
1834–36 William Brown
1836–38 George Ballingall
1838–40 Adam Hunter
1840–42 Richard Huie
1842–44 Andrew Fyfe
1844–46 James Simson
1846–48 Samuel Alexander Pagan
1848–49 John Argyll Robertson
1849–51 James Syme
1851–53 James Scarth Combe
1853–55 Archibald Inglis
1855–57 Andrew Wood
1857–59 Robert Omond
1859–61 Andrew Douglas Maclagan 
1861–63 Patrick Small Newbigging
1863–65 Benjamin Bell
1865–67 James Dunsmure
1867–69 James Spence
1869–72 James Gillespie
1872–73 William Walker
1873–75 James Simson
1875–77 Sir Henry Littlejohn
1877–79 Sir Patrick Heron Watson
1879–82 Francis Brodie Imlach
1882–83 Sir William Turner
1883–84 John Smith
1885–87 Douglas Argyll Robertson
1887–89 Joseph Bell
1889–91 John Duncan
1891–93 Robert James Blair Cunynghame
1893–95 Peter Maclaren
1895–97 John Struthers
1897–99 John Chiene

20th century
1899–1901 James Dunsmure
1901–03 Sir John Halliday Croom
1903–05 Sir Patrick Heron Watson
1905–07 Charles MacGillivray
1907–10 Joseph Montagu Cotterill
1910–12 Sir George Andreas Berry
1912–14 Francis Mitchell Caird
1914–17 Sir James Hodsdon
1917–19 Robert Johnston
1919–21 George Mackay
1921–23 Sir David Wallace
1923–25 Sir Harold Jalland Stiles
1925–27 Arthur Logan Turner
1927–29 Alexander Miles
1929–31 James Haig Ferguson
1931–33 John Dowden
1933–35 Arthur Henry Havens Sinclair
1935–37 Sir Henry Wade
1937–39 William James Stuart
1939–41 Harry Moss Traquair
1942–43 John William Struthers
1943–45 Robert William Johnstone
1945–47 James Methuen Graham
1947–49 Francis Jardine
1949–51 Walter Quarry Wood
1951–56 Sir Walter Mercer
1957–62 Sir John Bruce
1962–64 James Johnston Mason Brown
1964–67 George Ian Scott
1967–70 James Roderick Johnston Cameron
1970–73 Sir Donald Douglas
1973–76 James Alexander Ross
1976–79 Andrew Wilkinson
1979–82 Francis John Gillingham
1982–85 Sir James Fraser
1985–88 Thomas Jaffray McNair
1989–91 Geoffrey Duncan Chisholm
1991–94 Patrick Stewart Boulter 
1994–97 Sir Robert Shields 
1997–2000 Arnold George Dominic Maran

21st century
2000–03 Sir John Temple
2003–06 John Allan Raymond Smith
2006–09 John D. Orr
2009–12 David Tolley
2012–15 Ian Ritchie
2015–18 Michael Lavell-Jones
2018–present    Michael Griffin

See also
 List of presidents of the Royal College of Physicians of Edinburgh

References

Presidents of the Royal College of Surgeons of Edinburgh
Royal College of Surgeons of Edinburgh
Presidents of the Royal College of Surgeons of Edinburgh
Presidents of the Royal College of Surgeons of Edinburgh